Beers, Steers + Queers (stylized as BEERS, STEERS + QVEERS: THE ALBVM) is the second studio album by American–Belgian industrial rock band Revolting Cocks. Released in May 1990, the album was supported by three singles and was reissued several times. Its sound is industrial and built upon repetitive percussion and samples. David Jeffries of AllMusic described Beers, Steers + Queers as dominating college radio and clubs. The album's supporting tour was recalled by Chris Connelly as "ridiculous" and particularly chaotic.

Content
The album opens with a telephone conversation between two southerners discussing an upcoming local appearance by the Revolting Cocks. They are unfamiliar with the band and interpret the name as belonging to a male strip show.

The band had to dramatically change the song "(Let's Get) Physical" to avoid a lawsuit by Olivia Newton-John's lawyers. Although they had changed the music, they had kept the original lyrics intact. When the writers heard the song, they threatened to sue the band. The final version contains almost completely original lyrics. Some promo copies of the album had been released with the original version intact as well. The original version was released in 1999 on the compilation Alternative Press presents Industrial Strength Machine Music (The Framework of Industrial Rock 1978-1995).

"Something Wonderful" includes the eponymous sample from the climactic scene from the movie 2010. "Beers, Steers & Queers" includes multiple samples from "My House" by Chuck Roberts.

"(Let's Talk) Physical" is a 6:50 loop of a single snare drum hit and Chris Connelly growling, "Talk!". This was taken from the original version of "(Let's Get) Physical".

The track "Get Down" contains a voice sample of the word "groovy", spoken by actor Bruce Campbell, taken from the movie Evil Dead II.

Track listing

Original album

(*) The LP version is 7:02.

2004 reissue

Singles
Stainless Steel Providers (1989)

 "Stainless Steel Providers"
 "At the Top"
 "T.V. Mind [Remix]" (CD only)

(Let's Get) Physical (1989)

 "(Let's Get) Physical"
 "(Let's Talk) Physical"

Beers, Steers & Queers (The Remixes) (1991)

 "Beers, Steers & Queers [Drop Yer Britches Mix]" / "Beers, Steers & Queers [Take 'Em Right Off Mix]"
 "Stainless Steel Providers [Live]"
 "Public Image [Live]"

Personnel
Credits adapted from liner notes

Revolting Cocks
Alain Jourgensen – guitar, programming, production
Luc van Acker – vocals (track 8)
Chris Connelly – vocals (tracks 2, 3, 5-7, 9), cover artwork
William Rieflin – drums, programming
Paul Barker – bass, programming, production

Additional personnel
Phildo Owens – vocals (track 1)
Nivek Ogre – vocals (track 4)
Fluffy – engineer
Brian Shanley – cover artwork

References

1990 albums
Revolting Cocks albums
Albums produced by Al Jourgensen
Wax Trax! Records albums